Donal Anthony Whelan is an Irish retired hurler who played as a left corner-back for the Waterford senior team.

Whelan was a key member of the team during a golden age for Waterford hurling in the late 1950s. During his inter-county career he won one All-Ireland medal and two Munster medals. Whelan was an All-Ireland runner-up on one occasion.

At club level Whelan enjoyed a lengthy career with Abbeyside.

References

1930 births
1995 deaths
Abbeyside hurlers
Waterford inter-county hurlers
Munster inter-provincial hurlers
All-Ireland Senior Hurling Championship winners